The Ngonye Falls Power Station, is a planned hydroelectric power station across the Zambezi River in Zambia. The power station will have maximum generating capacity of  when completely developed. The energy will be sold to ZESCO under a long-term power purchase agreement. It is named after the nearby Ngonye Falls.

Location
The power station will be located on the east bank of the Zambezi River, near the town of Sioma, in the Sioma District of the Western Province of Zambia.

Overview
The power station will be a run-of-river type, without an impounding dam or large water reservoir. A  canal on the western bank of River Zambezi will divert the fast-running water to the power station, where the water will turn turbines to generate electricity. A new 220kiloVolt transmission line will convey the energy to the border town of Sesheke, where the energy will enter the national grid. While most of the power is intended for use in the Western Province of Zambia, some of it will be available for export to the members of the Southern African Power Pool.

Ownership
Ngonye Falls Hydroelectric Power Station that is under development, is owned and is expected to be managed and operated by Western Power Company Limited, the special purpose vehicle company established by the consortium of investors in the power station. The table below illustrates the members of the consortium.

Other partners, consultants and advisers on this project include (a) the Mott MacDonald Group, (b) the Multiconsult Group and the Development Bank of Southern Africa.

Other considerations
The hydropower station with capacity of 180 megawatts is capable of generating 830 GWh of clean carbon free renewable energy annually. This is enough to supply 350,000 Zambian households.

See also

 List of power stations in Zambia
 Ngonye Solar Power Station

References

External links
 Approximate Location of Ngonye Hydroelectric Power Station

Energy infrastructure in Zambia
Hydroelectric power stations in Zambia
Western Province, Zambia